Hugh III (died 3 March 1383) was the eldest son and successor of Marianus IV of Arborea and Timbor of Rocabertí. He succeeded in 1376 as Judge of Arborea and Count of Goceano. In most ways he continued and augmented the policies of his father. He has been praised as a legislator who led a saggio e moderato governo: "wise and moderate government."

In 1363, he married a daughter of John III of Viterbo, of the Da Vico family, but she died in 1369. They had a daughter named Benedetta, who in 1373 was asked in marriage by the Louis I, Duke of Anjou, second son of King Charles V of France, without success.

Hugh participated in his father's last military campaign against Pere de Luna, the Catalan general, commanding one of the battles which ambushed him in a pincer movement at Oristano in 1365. As judge, he continued to oppose the pretensions of Peter IV of Aragon and the Catalans and warred against them.

He made enemies with the nobles, who tried to incite the poor to rebel. On 3 March 1383, Hugh and his daughter—and heiress—were assassinated at Oristano during a popular revolt. The rebels declared a "Republic" and made the law (which Hugh and his father had done so much to codify, expand, and improve) the sovereignty in Arborea. Hugh's successor was his nephew Frederick, under the regency of his sister Eleanor, who pacified the rebels and reinstated judicial government.

Notes

Sources
Nowé, Laura Sannia. Dai "lumi" dalla patria Italiana: Cultura letteraria sarda. Mucchi Editore: Modena, 1996.

1383 deaths
Judges (judikes) of Arborea
Year of birth unknown
1337 births